Maria Jacquemetton (née Mastras) is a Greek American television writer and producer. She graduated from Lehigh University in 1983. She served as a producer for the first season of Mad Men and co-wrote, with Andre Jacquemetton, three episodes of the season. Alongside her colleagues on the writing staff she won a Writers Guild of America Award for Best New Series and was nominated for the award for Best Dramatic Series at the February 2008 ceremony for her work on the season. She returned as a producer for the second season and continued to write episodes. She was nominated for the WGA award for Best Dramatic Series a second time at the February 2009 ceremony for her work on the second season. She won the WGA Award for Best Drama Series (after being nominated for the third consecutive year) at the February 2010 ceremony for her work on the third season.

She has been nominated for a Primetime Emmy Award for Outstanding Writing for a Drama Series for writing the episodes "Six Month Leave", "Blowing Smoke", and "Commissions and Fees".

Family
Jacquemetton is the older sister of George Mastras, a novelist and scriptwriter for the AMC TV show Breaking Bad.

References

External links

American screenwriters
American television producers
American women television producers
American television writers
American writers of Greek descent
Lehigh University alumni
Living people
American women screenwriters
American women television writers
Writers Guild of America Award winners
Place of birth missing (living people)
Year of birth missing (living people)
21st-century American women